Keegan Smith (born June 23, 1998) is an American tennis player.

Smith has a career high ATP singles ranking of 339 achieved on September 19, 2022. He also has a career high ATP doubles ranking of 262 achieved on September 12, 2022.

Smith made his ATP main draw debut at the 2019 Hall of Fame Open after receiving a wildcard for the doubles main draw.  He also played the U.S. Open main draw doubles in 2019 and in 2022.

Smith played college tennis at UCLA, where he and Maxime Cressy won the 2019 NCAA Men's Tennis Championship doubles tournament.

ATP Challenger and ITF World Tennis Tour finals

Singles: 3 (2–1)

References

External links

1998 births
Living people
American male tennis players
Sportspeople from Wilmington, North Carolina
Tennis players from San Diego
UCLA Bruins men's tennis players
21st-century American people